Bullock is an English surname. Notable people with the surname include:

A–L
Bullock family
Alan Bullock (1914–2004), historian and academic
Albert Bullock (1884–1951), English footballer
Alexander H. Bullock, governor of Massachusetts from 1866 to 1868
Anna Mae Bullock, birth name of Tina Turner, American singer, dancer and entertainer
Arthur Bullock (1909–1997), English professional footballer
Bob Bullock (1929–1999), American politician from Texas
Carrie E. Bullock (1887–1962), African American nurse
Charles J. Bullock (1869–1941), American economist, professor at Harvard
Charles S. Bullock III (born 1942), American political scientist
Chick Bullock, American jazz and dance band vocalist
Craig Anthony Bullock, known as DJ Homicide
Dan Bullock, United States Marine
Darren Bullock (born 1969), former English footballer
Emily Valentine Bullock, New Zealand artist
Ernest Bullock (1890–1979), English organist, composer, and educator
Frederick or Fred Bullock, several people
George Bullock (disambiguation), several people; i.a.:
George Bullock (professor) (c. 1521 – 1572), English Catholic theologian
George Bullock (sculptor) (1777–1818), English sculptor and furniture maker
Geoff Bullock (born 1956), Australian Pentecostal pastor and songwriter
Gesine Bullock-Prado (born 1970), American chef, author, attorney, sister of Sandra Bullock
Guy Bullock (1887–1956), diplomat and mountaineer
Harvey Bullock (comics), fictional character from Batman
Harvey Bullock (writer) (1921–2006), American screenwriter
Heather E. Bullock, American social psychologist
Hiram Bullock (1955–2008), American jazz-funk guitarist
Jim J. Bullock (born 1955), American actor
Jeffrey Bullock, American university president
Jeffrey W. Bullock, American politician
Jimmy Bullock, English footballer
John Bullock (bishop) (died 1439), Augustinian canon and prelate
Julia Bullock (born 1987), American operatic soprano
Lee Bullock (born 1981), English footballer
Louis Bullock (born 1976), American basketball player

M–Z
Martha Bullock (1851–1939), wife of Seth Bullock
Martin Bullock (born 1975), English footballer
Matthew Bullock, African-American man who was charged with intent to murder without evidence and fled to Canada
Matthew Bullock (footballer) (born 1980), retired English footballer
Mickey Bullock (born 1946), English former footballer
Mike Bullock, American comics artist
Norman Bullock, English footballer and football manager
Randy Bullock, American football placekicker
Red Bullock (1911–1988), Major League Baseball pitcher
Reggie Bullock (born 1991), American basketball player
Richard Bullock (1847–1921), Cornish sharpshooter, also known as Deadwood Dick
Robert Bullock (1826–1905), American politician
Rufus Brown Bullock (1834–1907), Reconstruction era governor of Georgia
Sandra Bullock (born 1964), American actress
S. Scott Bullock (born 1956), American actor
Seth Bullock (1849–1919), United States marshal
Simon Bullock (born 1962), English footballer
Steve Bullock (disambiguation), several people
Susan Bullock (born 1958), British soprano
Theodore Holmes Bullock (1915–2005), American neurologist
Théodore-Lafleur Bullock (1901-1972), Canadian serviceman
Thomas Bullock (Mormon) (1816–1886), English Mormon pioneer
Tony Bullock (born 1972), English footballer
Walter Bullock (1907–1953), American song composer
William Bullock (actor), English actor
William Bullock (collector), English traveller, naturalist and antiquarian
William Bullock (inventor), American who invented the web rotary printing press
William Henry Bullock, U.S. Roman Catholic churchman
Wynn Bullock, American photographer

See also
Daniel Bullocks (born 1983), American football player
Josh Bullocks (born 1983), American football player

English-language surnames